November 2015

See also

References

 11
November 2015 events in the United States